is the administrative centre of the municipality of Bamble, Norway.

The town of Langesund was established as a municipality 1 January 1838 (see formannskapsdistrikt). It was merged with Bamble 1 January 1964.

In the early days, Langesund was one of the most important shipping towns in Norway.
Peter Wessel Tordenskiold got one of his ships built in Langesund, Løvendals Gallej.  It was known as Longsound in English in the 1800s.

It is possible to visit the remains of the old Coastal Fortress on Langesundstangen on the extreme end of the Langesund peninsula. The fort was established during the Second World War by Nazi Germany and later used by the Norwegian Coastal Artillery and Home Guard until 1993.

Langesund is one of the most celebrated summer towns in Norway because of the large number of sunny days.
It is also well known for Wrightegaarden, a building that hosts outdoor concerts every weekend the whole summer.
Artists like Bob Dylan, A-ha, Elton John and Little Richard have played in Wrightegaarden. Langesund marks the border between Ytre Oslofjord and Skagerrak.

Landmarks 
The best-known landmark in Langesund is Langøytangen fyr, a lighthouse placed on the peak of Langøya, a kilometre-long island right outside of Langesund. The island group east of the town are called Arøya.

A short walk outside of the town centre, facing the Skagerrak strait, lies the decommissioned military fort known as Tangen Fortress.

Mathematician Atle Selberg, musician Vidar Busk, Norwegian-American Lutheran theologian Marcus Olaus Bockman and Instagram influencer Jens Kulås were all born in Langesund.

Cultural contribution
Artists like Vidar Busk and Stephen Ackels are originally from Langesund. The concertplace Wrightegaarden is famous for its intimate concerts and is hosting big Norwegian bands like Postgirobygget every year. Langesund is mentioned in the opening lyrics of Postgirobygget's song Sommer på jorda (Summer on Earth).

The name
The meaning of the name is 'the long strait.'

Former municipalities of Norway
Cities and towns in Norway
Port cities and towns in Norway
Populated places in Vestfold og Telemark
Bamble